is a shōjo manga by Yasuko Aoike which originally began publication in 1976 by Akita Shoten.  The series ran irregularly in the Japanese anthology magazine Viva Princess from December 1976 to April 1979, then moved to the sister publication Princess beginning in September 1979. It was featured regularly in Princess, with several later side stories appearing in Viva Princess, until August 1989. It went on hiatus for several years, then reappeared in Princess in May 1995 and ran irregularly through December 2007. As of January 2009, it is once again regularly featured in Princess Gold. The English translation by CMX began publication in 2004. It has also been translated to Chinese, as Romantic Hero, with 21 volumes; as well as to Thai, with 20 volumes.

The series revolves around the adventures of Dorian Red Gloria, Earl of Gloria, an openly gay English lord who is an art thief known as "Eroica", and Major Klaus Heinz von dem Eberbach, an uptight West German NATO major.

The series is driven by frequent inadvertent encounters between Dorian and Klaus, with Dorian often disrupting Klaus's missions. Dorian has developed a fondness for and flirts incessantly with Klaus, who typically reacts with extreme disgust. Other reoccurring characters include Dorian and Klaus's respective subordinates and Klaus's enemies from the Russian KGB.

The series is generally comedic, although it involves violence, theft, and bizarre international incidents. Much of the series spoofs spy stories, as indicated by the title, a play on the James Bond novel From Russia, with Love.

Plot

Release

Reception

As of the mid-1980s, fan translations of From Eroica with Love began to circulate through the slash fiction community, creating a "tenuous link" between slash and shōnen-ai.
From Eroica with Love is more popular with slash fans than it has been with dōjinshi artists.  The series has been described as an example of a movement in shōnen-ai and yaoi to depict more masculine men, as part of the audience's increasing comfort with objectifying males.

References

External links
 https://web.archive.org/web/20060402193820/http://aoikeyasuko.com/ (Author's site, mostly in Japanese)
 
 

1976 manga
Akita Shoten manga
CMX (comics) titles
Comedy anime and manga
Shōjo manga
Shōnen-ai anime and manga